Matej Poplatnik (born 15 July 1992) is a Slovenian footballer who plays as a forward for Ilirija 1911.

Career
Poplatnik started his senior career with Zarica Kranj, before joining Triglav Kranj in 2012. He made his Slovenian PrvaLiga debut for Triglav in a 1–0 away loss against Celje on 15 July 2012, coming on as a second-half substitute. Poplatnik scored his first goal for Triglav a week later in a 1–0 win over Aluminij at Stanko Mlakar Stadium. In the 2014–15 season, he finished as Slovenian Second League top scorer with 18 goals.

On 20 June 2015, Poplatnik signed a two-year contract with Bulgarian side Montana, after a successful trial period with the club.

On 8 July 2018, Poplatnik joined Indian Super League club Kerala Blasters. He scored on his debut, in a 2–0 league away victory against ATK on 29 September 2018.

On 30 July 2019, Poplatnik joined Hungarian club Kaposvári Rákóczi on a season-long loan.

On 8 July 2020, Poplatnik signed for Scottish Premiership club Livingston. He would join Scottish Championship side Raith Rovers on a season-long loan. For Raith Rovers, Poplatnik scored eleven goals in all competitions, including two goals in a victory in the 2022 Scottish Challenge Cup Final.

Personal life
His older brother, Aleš Poplatnik, is also a professional footballer.

Honours
Triglav Kranj
Slovenian Second League: 2016–17

Raith Rovers
Scottish Challenge Cup: 2021–22

References

External links
NZS profile 

1992 births
Living people
Footballers from Ljubljana
Slovenian footballers
Slovenia youth international footballers
Slovenia under-21 international footballers
Slovenian expatriate footballers
Association football forwards
NK Triglav Kranj players
FC Montana players
Kerala Blasters FC players
Kaposvári Rákóczi FC players
Livingston F.C. players
Raith Rovers F.C. players
ND Ilirija 1911 players
Slovenian PrvaLiga players
Slovenian Second League players
First Professional Football League (Bulgaria) players
Indian Super League players
Nemzeti Bajnokság I players
Scottish Professional Football League players
Slovenian expatriate sportspeople in Bulgaria
Expatriate footballers in Bulgaria
Slovenian expatriate sportspeople in India
Expatriate footballers in India
Slovenian expatriate sportspeople in Hungary
Expatriate footballers in Hungary
Slovenian expatriate sportspeople in Scotland
Expatriate footballers in Scotland